Eduardo Luis D'Angelo Belsito (Montevideo, 4 January 1939 - 18 October 2014) was a Uruguayan actor, comedian and impressionist.

In the 1960s he started a long career on television. Together with a notable group of Uruguayan humorists (Ricardo Espalter, Enrique Almada, Julio Frade, Raimundo Soto), he was part of several successful humor programs: Telecataplúm (1962), Jaujarana (1969-1972), Hupumorpo (1974-1977), Comicolor (1981-1984), Híperhumor (1984-1989), Decalegrón (1977-2002).

In 1989 he took part in the film Eversmile, New Jersey alongside Daniel Day-Lewis.

References

External links
 Interview to Eduardo D'Angelo 
 Something to remember 
 

1939 births
2014 deaths
Uruguayan people of Italian descent
People from Montevideo
Uruguayan male actors
Uruguayan male comedians
Impressionists (entertainers)
Uruguayan male voice actors